Jill Nalder (born 1961) is a Welsh actress and activist. She is known for her career in theatre as well as her contributions to HIV/AIDS activism.

She was the inspiration behind character Jill Baxter in the Channel 4 series It's a Sin.

Early life
Nalder was brought up in Neath, Wales. In 1980 she moved to London where she trained at Mountview Academy of Theatre Arts in Crouch End. She graduated in 1982 with a qualification in acting and musical theatre.

Acting career
Upon graduating, Nalder began performing in West End productions. She played Madame Thenardier in Les Miserables at the Palace Theatre and in the original 1994 cast of Sam Mendes' production of Oliver! at the London Palladium. Nalder has also appeared in musical touring productions.

She appeared as a dancer in the 2017 film Finding Your Feet, directed by Richard Loncraine.  She is one of the founder members of The WestEnders, a musical theatre group with a repertoire of songs drawn from the West End and Broadway musicals.

HIV/AIDS activism
Nalder became involved in HIV/AIDS activism while living in London in the 1980s at the height of the AIDS crisis. With other members of the West End theatre community, Nalder participated in fundraising campaigns, including cabaret shows and performances in Soho, to raise money to support AIDS awareness and research. Nalder also supported gay men suffering from AIDS and made numerous visits to AIDS patients in hospitals around London, including Middlesex Hospital, and Chelsea and Westminster Hospital's  AIDS unit.

In 2021, screenwriter and producer Russell T Davies based the character of Jill Baxter in his Channel 4 television miniseries It's A Sin, on Nalder's life at the time. Nalder and Davies first met at the age of 14 while performing in youth theatre in West Glamorgan in Wales and remained friends thereafter. She shared her life stories with Davies as he was developing his script. The Hampstead flat Nalder shared with three fellow students during the 1980s inspired the "Pink Palace" flat in the series. The character is played by Lydia West, whilst Nalder plays her mother Christine Baxter.

Personal life 
Nalder is single and lives in Cambridgeshire.

References

External links 

Living people
20th-century Welsh actresses
21st-century Welsh actresses
Actresses from Swansea
Alumni of the Mountview Academy of Theatre Arts
HIV/AIDS activists
Welsh musical theatre actresses
Welsh stage actresses
Welsh women activists
1961 births